The Last Panthers is a Franco-British crime drama television series created by Jack Thorne and directed by Johan Renck. It is a fictional story inspired by the notorious Balkan jewel thieves the Pink Panthers. The six-part series premiered on Canal+ on 26 October 2015 in France and on Sky Atlantic on 12 November 2015 in the UK, Ireland, Italy, Germany and Austria. It first aired in the US on SundanceTV in April 2016.

Premise 
The show opens with a diamond heist bearing a resemblance to those of a gang of thieves known as the Pink Panthers, before quickly delving into the dark heart of Europe where a shadowy alliance of gangsters and 'banksters' now rule.

Cast 
Samantha Morton as Naomi Franckom
John Hurt as Tom Kendle
Tahar Rahim as Khalil Rachedi
Goran Bogdan as Milan Celik
Camélia Jordana as Samira
Corinne Masiero as The Judge
Igor Benčina as Zlatko Mladić

Music 
On 6 October 2015, international news media announced that David Bowie had arranged his new track "Blackstar" as the theme song of the show, as well as introducing the listener to 45 seconds of the intro. The series director, Johan Renck, said of both the artist and the song; "The piece of music he laid before us embodied every aspect of our characters and the series itself: dark, brooding, beautiful and sentimental (in the best possible incarnation of this word). All along, the man inspired and intrigued me and as the process passed, I was overwhelmed with his generosity. I still can’t fathom what actually happened".

Rolling Stone magazine's Daniel Krep said that the tune reminded him "of the bleak, haunting instrumentals on the back half of Bowie's 1977 album "Heroes"", and The Guardian suggested the song revealed Bowie 'at his most brooding.'

The series is soundtracked by Warp Records artist Clark. It is his debut TV score and director Johan Renck said "Chris's sensibilities and brazen creativity was bang on for a score to deal with everything from the Biblical grandeur of the story, via brooding darkness all the way over to tender sentimentality. He had it covered."

References

External links
 

Sky Atlantic original programming
2015 British television series debuts
2015 British television series endings
2010s British crime television series
2010s British drama television series
2010s British television miniseries
Canal+ original programming
English-language television shows
French-language television shows
Serbian-language television shows
Television series by StudioCanal
Television shows directed by Johan Renck
Television shows set in England
Television shows set in France
Works about the Serbian Mafia